Chih-Wei Hu (born November 4, 1993) is a Taiwanese professional baseball pitcher for the Uni-President Lions of the Chinese Professional Baseball League (CPBL). He has played in Major League Baseball (MLB) for the Tampa Bay Rays.

Career

Minnesota Twins

Hu was signed by the Minnesota Twins organization as an international free agent on August 3, 2012. He made his professional debut in 2013 with the Gulf Coast Twins, posting a 2.45 ERA in 12 appearances. In 2014, he pitched with the rookie-level Elizabethton Twins and Single-A Cedar Rapids Kernels, logging a cumulative 8–2 record and 2.15 ERA in 13 games, 12 of them starts. Hu began the 2015 season with the High-A Fort Myers Miracle, and also pitched in 1 game for the Triple-A Rochester Red Wings.

Tampa Bay Rays

On July 31, 2015, the Twins traded Hu and Alexis Tapia to the Tampa Bay Rays in exchange for Kevin Jepsen. He finished the year with the High-A Charlotte Stone Crabs, but struggled to an 0–3 record and 7.36 ERA in 5 games. In 2016, Hu split the season between the Double-A Montgomery Biscuits and the Triple-A Durham Bulls, recording a 7–9 record and 2.75 ERA with 114 strikeouts in 147.1 innings of work. Hu was named to the roster of the World team for the 2016 All-Star Futures Game. The Rays added him to their 40-man roster after the season.

Hu began the 2017 season with Durham before being promoted to the major leagues for the first time on April 23. He made his MLB debut the following day, pitching a scoreless innings of relief against the Baltimore Orioles. He finished his rookie season with a 1–1 record and 2.70 ERA with 9 strikeouts in 10.0 innings of work across 6 appearances. In 2018, Hu spent the majority of the year in Durham, but recorded a 4.15 ERA in 5 appearances with the Rays.

Cleveland Indians
On November 19, 2018, Hu was traded to the Cleveland Indians in exchange for minor league infielder Gionti Turner. Hu was assigned to the Triple-A Columbus Clippers to begin the 2019 season. On July 3, 2019, he was designated for assignment by the Indians without having appeared in a game for the team. He was outrighted to Columbus, and later demoted to the Double-A Akron RubberDucks before being released by the Indians on July 30.

Chicago Cubs
On August 8, 2019, Hu signed a minor league contract with the Chicago Cubs organization. He finished the year in Chicago's minor league system, posting a 2–2 record between the Triple-A Iowa Cubs and the Double-A Tennessee Smokies. On November 4, 2019, he elected free agency.

San Diego Padres
On December 19, 2019, Hu signed a minor league contract with the San Diego Padres organization. Hu did not play in a game in 2020 due to the cancellation of the minor league season because of the COVID-19 pandemic. On November 2, 2020, he elected free agency.

In June 2021, an unnamed team in Nippon Professional Baseball (NPB) made an offer to sign Hu, but the amount was not enough to convince Hu to go overseas and he did not sign with the team.

Uni-President Lions
On July 1, 2021, Hu announced that he would enter the mid-season draft in the Chinese Professional Baseball League (CPBL). He was selected fourth overall by the Uni-President Lions.

International career
He played for Chinese Taipei at the 2014 Asian Games.

See also
 List of Major League Baseball players from Taiwan

References

External links

1993 births
Living people
Akron RubberDucks players
Asian Games medalists in baseball
Asian Games silver medalists for Chinese Taipei
Baseball players at the 2014 Asian Games
Baseball players from Taichung
Cedar Rapids Kernels players
Columbus Clippers players
Durham Bulls players
Elizabethton Twins players
Fort Myers Miracle players
Gulf Coast Twins players
Iowa Cubs players
Major League Baseball pitchers
Major League Baseball players from Taiwan
Mayos de Navojoa players
Medalists at the 2014 Asian Games
Montgomery Biscuits players
Taiwanese expatriate baseball players in the United States
Tampa Bay Rays players
Tennessee Smokies players
Rochester Red Wings players
Taiwanese expatriate baseball players in Mexico
2023 World Baseball Classic players